Aaja Sanam is a 1968 Bollywood film directed by Yusuf Naqvi. The film stars Feroz Khan, Tanuja and Deven Verma. The film's music is by Usha Khanna and the lyrics by Indeevar.

Cast
 Feroz Khan ... Dr. Satish
 Tanuja ... Shanti
 Deven Verma ... Dr. Kaushal Verma
 Sulochana Chatterjee ... Kamini
 Bipin Gupta ... Kamini's dad
 Mukri ... Chandu
 Shivraj ... Radhekiran

Plot
Dr. Satish travels from the big city to a small village, where he can serve the poor who cannot afford to go to the city for medical treatment. Once in the village, he meets with Shanti, who lives with her dad, Radhekiran, a watchman. Both Shanti and Satish fall in love, and exchange vows to be married. Radhekiran has an accident, and dies, leaving Shanti to re-locate, without notifying Satish. Satish is devastated at losing Shanti, and tries to locate her, to no avail. His parents want him to marry Kamini, and he agrees to do so. It is then he comes across Shanti, and he is shocked to see that Shanti has given birth to baby-boy, but will not disclose who the father is.

Soundtrack

External links
 

1968 films
1960s Indian films
1960s Hindi-language films
Films scored by Usha Khanna